Ellington may refer to:

Places

United Kingdom 
Ellington, Cambridgeshire
Ellington, Northumberland
Ellington High and Low, a civil parish in North Yorkshire
High Ellington
Low Ellington

United States 
Ellington Airport (Texas), Houston, Texas
Ellington, Connecticut
Ellington Township, Adams County, Illinois
Ellington Township, Hancock County, Iowa
Ellington, Missouri
Ellington, New York
Ellington Township, Michigan
Ellington Township, Dodge County, Minnesota
Ellington, Wisconsin

People

Given name 
Ellington Ratliff, American drummer and actor
Ellington Feint, a character from Lemony Snicket's All the Wrong Questions

Surname 
Brian Ellington (born 1990), American baseball player
Buford Ellington (1907–1972), Governor of Tennessee from 1959 to 1963
Christina Ellington (born 1982), Miss New York of 2004
Douglas Ellington (1886–1960), American architect
Duke Ellington (1899–1974), American composer, pianist and bandleader
Edward Ellington (1877–1967), Marshal of the British Royal Air Force
Edward B. Ellington (1845–1914), British hydraulic engineer
Erik Ellington (born 1977), professional skateboarder
Mercer Ellington (1919–1996), American composer, trumpeter, and bandleader
Nathan Ellington (born 1981), English professional footballer
Noble Ellington (born 1942), Louisiana state legislator and cotton merchant; see Louisiana Political Museum and Hall of Fame
Ray Ellington (1916–1985), English singer, drummer and bandleader, AKA Harry Pitts Brown
Wayne Ellington (born 1987), American basketball player

Other
Ellington (band)
Ellington (horse), a Thoroughbred racehorse, winner of the 1856 Epsom Derby
Ellington (typeface), a font designed by Michael Harvey
Ellington Agricultural Center, Brentwood, Tennessee, U.S.
, a United States Navy patrol boat in commission from 1917 to 1919
Ellington Colliery, a former coal mine in Northumberland, England

See also
Ellington Airport (disambiguation)